Almost 175 athletes across 15 different sports competed for Wales at the 2010 Commonwealth Games in Delhi, India, between 3 October and 14 October 2010.

In order to send a team to the 2010 Commonwealth Games, Wales needed to raise £500,000. For this the Commonwealth Games Council for Wales established a scheme called the Friends of Commonwealth Games in Wales, in which individuals and small businesses could contribute a minimum of £1000 in the four years leading up to the Commonwealth Games.

The Queen's Baton toured Wales, beginning in north Wales on 9 November 2009, and going on to mid and west Wales on 10 November and to south Wales on 11 November.

The chef de mission for the Welsh team was Chris Jenkins whilst the overall team captain was weightlifter Michaela Breeze.
Of the original selections only cyclist Geraint Thomas (health issues) and decathlete David Guest (injury) did not travel to Delhi.

Jazmin Carlin and Becky James were the only team members to win more than one medal. Each won a silver and a bronze.
In his seventh Commonwealth Games appearance bowls player Rob Weale won his second gold medal, his first having been 24 years earlier in 1986.

The medals won in Delhi raised Wales' all-time medal tally at the Commonwealth Games to 235 (52 gold, 76 silver, 107 bronze).

Medalists

Team Wales at the 2010 Commonwealth Games

Aquatics 

Aquatics Medal Tally

Swimming 

Team Wales consists of 16 swimmers.

Men 

Men – EAD (Para-Sports)

Women

Women – EAD (Para-Sports)

Archery 

Team Wales consists of 6 archers.

Best performance – Quarter-finalsTapani Kalmaru (Men's Compound Individual)Janette Howells (Women's Compound Individual)Women's Team Compound

Men

Women

Athletics 

Athletics Medal Tally

Team Wales consists of 21 athletes.

Men – Track

Men – Throws

Men – Jumps

Men – Combined

Men – Road

Men – EAD (Para-Sports)

Women – Track

Women – Throws

Women – Jumps

Women – Combined

Women – Road

Women – EAD (Para-Sports)

Badminton 

Team Wales consists of 7 badminton players.

Team Wales:
Men: Matthew Hughes, Jonathan Morgan, James Phillips, James Van Hooijdonck
Women: Caroline Harvey, Sarah Thomas, Carissa Turner

Men

Women

Mixed

Team Event

Boxing 

Team Wales consists of 9 boxers.

Men

Cycling 

Team Wales consists of 17 cyclists.

Team Wales:
Men: Yanto Barker, Paul Esposti, Jon Mould, Lewis Oliva, Rob Partridge, Sam Harrison, Luke Rowe, Geraint Thomas, Rhys Lloyd
Women: Jessica Allen, Angharad Mason, Kara Chesworth, Lily Matthews, Nicole Cooke, Alex Greenfield, Hannah Rich, Becky James

Road 
Men

Women

Track 

Men

Women

Gymnastics 

Team Wales consists of 6 gymnasts

Artistic 
Men
Alex Rothe, Grant Gardiner, Matthew Hennessey, Robert Hunter, Clinton Purnell

Women

Rhythmic 
Women
Francesca Jones

Hockey 

Team Wales consists of 16 hockey players.

Summary

Men
Wales' Men did not qualify for the 2010 Commonwealth Games

Women
Sarah Thomas
Alys Brooks
Natalie Blyth
Dawn Mitchell
Katrin Budd
Emma Griffiths
Carys Hopkins
Louise Pugh-Bevan
Philippa Jones
Claire Lowry
Elen Mumford
Ella Rafferty
Maggs Rees
Abigail Welsford
Leah Wilkinson
Emma Keen

Pool B

Lawn Bowls 

Team Wales consists of 12 lawn bowls players over 6 events

Men
Robert Weale
Jason Greenslade
Martin Selway
Chris Blake
Andrew Fleming
Marc Wyatt

Women
Carol Difford
Anwen Button
Hannah Smith
Kathy Pearce
Isabel Jones
Wendy Price

Rugby Sevens 

Summary

Men

Group B

Shooting 

Team Wales consists of 19.

Men
Malcolm Allen,
Rhys Price,
Mike Wixey,
Scott Morgan,
David Phelps,
Jamie Dummer,
John Croydon,
Steve Pengelly,
Alan Green,
Robert Oxford,
Gareth Morris

Women
Johanne Brekke,
Jennifer Corish,
Sian Corish,
Helen Warnes,
Cheryl Gizzi,
Jacquelyn Lewis,
Rachel Gravell,
Nicola Wilson

Clay Target 
Men

Women

Pistol 
Men

Women

Small Bore and Air Rifle 
Men

Women

Full Bore 
Open

Table Tennis 

Team Wales consists of 8 table tennis.

Men
Ryan Jenkins
Stephen Jenkins
Adam Robertson
Patrick Thomas

Women
Charlotte Carey
Naomi Owen
Angharad Phillips
Megan Phillips

Women – EAD (Para-Sports)

Mixed

Tennis 

Team Wales consists of 2 players in 1 event.

Men's Singles

Weightlifting 

Team Wales consists of 6 weightlifters.

Men

Men – EAD (Powerlifting)

Women

Women – EAD (Powerlifting)

Wrestling 

Team Wales consists of 7 wrestlers.

Men: Brett Hawthorn, Damion Arzu, Kiran Manu, Craig Pilling
Women: Non Evans, Sarah Connolly, Kate Rennie

Men – Freestyle

Men – Greco-Roman

Women

See also 
 Wales at the 2006 Commonwealth Games

References 

2010
Nations at the 2010 Commonwealth Games
Commonwealth Games